Katorga (from medieval and modern Greek: katergon, κάτεργον, "galley") was a system of penal labor in the Russian Empire and the Soviet Union (see Katorga labor in the Soviet Union). Prisoners were sent to remote penal colonies in vast uninhabited areas of Siberia and Russian Far East where voluntary settlers and workers were never available in sufficient numbers. The prisoners had to perform forced labor under harsh conditions.

History

Katorga, a category of punishment within the judicial system of the Russian Empire, had many of the features associated with labor-camp imprisonment: confinement, simplified facilities (as opposed to prisons), and forced labor, usually involving hard, unskilled or semi-skilled work.

Katorga camps were established in the 17th century by Alexis of Russia in newly conquered, underpopulated areas of Siberia and the Russian Far East - regions that had few towns or food sources. Despite the isolated conditions, a few prisoners successfully escaped to populated areas. From these times, Siberia gained its fearful connotation of punishment, which was further enhanced by the Soviet gulag system.

After the change in Russian penal law in 1847, exile and katorga became common punishments for participants in national uprisings within the Russian Empire. This led to increasing numbers of Poles sent to Siberia for katorga. These people have become known in Poland as Sybiraks ("Siberians"). Some of them remained there, forming a Polish minority in Siberia.

The most common occupations in katorga camps were mining and timber work. A notable example involved the construction of the Amur Cart Road (Амурская колесная дорога), praised as a success in the organisation of penal labor.

In 1891 Anton Chekhov, the Russian writer and playwright, visited the katorga settlements on Sakhalin island in the Russian Far East and wrote about the conditions there in his book Sakhalin Island. He criticized the short-sightedness and incompetence of the officials in charge that led to poor living standards, waste of government funds, and decreased productivity. Aleksandr Solzhenitsyn, in his book about the Soviet-era labor camps, Gulag Archipelago, quoted Chekhov extensively to illustrate the enormous deterioration of living conditions for inmates and the huge increase in the number of people sent there in the Soviet era, compared to the katorga system of Chekhov's time.

Peter Kropotkin, while aide de camp to the governor of Transbaikalia in the 1860s, was appointed to inspect the state of the prison system in the area; he later described his findings in his book In Russian and French Prisons (1887).

Notable katorgas 
Nerchinsk katorga (Нерчинская каторга)
Akatuy katorga (Акатуйская каторга)
Algacha katorga (Алгачинская каторга)
Kara katorga (Карийская каторга)
Maltsev katorga (Мальцевская каторга)
Zerentuy katorga (Зерентуйская каторга)
Sakhalin katorga (Сахалинская каторга)

Famous katorga convicts

Georgian
 Joseph Stalin escaped twice, in 1902 and 1908, before being finally confined in a katorga on the Yenisei River 1913–1917, finally being released at the time of the February Revolution

Russian
 Aleksandr Nikolayevich Radishchev, author and social critic arrested and exiled under Catherine the Great
 Author Fyodor Dostoyevsky, from 1849 until 1854, for revolutionary activity against Tsar Nicholas I.
 Nikolai Chernyshevsky, from 1864 until 1872 for narodnik revolutionary activity.
 David Riazanov (1891–1895), a narodnik at the time and latter founder of the Marx-Engels Institute
 Revolutionary Vera Figner, a well-known political activist.
 Decembrists: initial verdict was 16 persons for termless katorga, 5 persons for 10 years, 15 persons for 6 years. After the trial, Tsar Nicholas I reduced the sentences; subsequent amnesties further shortened the terms.
 Fanny Kaplan, a Russian political revolutionary and attempted assassin of Vladimir Lenin.
 Sukhomlinov, a Russian former Minister of War, for abuse of power.
 Andrei Sinyavsky, a dissident author tried in the 1960s with Yuli Daniel

Polish

 Cheka founder Felix Dzerzhinsky, imprisoned (and escaped) twice, in 1897 and 1900, for revolutionary activity.
 Aleksander Czekanowski
 Jan Czerski
 Benedykt Dybowski
 Bronisław Piłsudski
 Józef Piłsudski 1887–92
 Piotr Wysocki
 Barbara Skarga 1944–54

Ukrainian
 Poet and artist Taras Shevchenko, from 1847 until 1857, for revolutionary activity against Tsar Nicholas I of Russia.
Lead Soviet rocket engineer during the space race, Sergei Korolev, from 1938 to 1944.

Soviet times

After the Russian Revolution of 1917 the Russian penal system was taken over by the Bolsheviks, who eventually transformed the katorga into the Gulag labor camps.

In 1943 the  "katorga labor" (каторжные работы) as a special, severe type of punishment was reintroduced. It was initially intended for Nazi collaborators, but other categories of political prisoners (for example, members of deported peoples who fled from exile) were also sentenced to "katorga labor". Prisoners sentenced to "katorga labor" were sent to gulag prison camps with the most harsh regime, and many of them died.

See also 
 Gulag
 Penal transportation

References 

 P.Kropotkin, In Russian and French Prisons, London: Ward and Downey; 1887.

Further reading
 Daly, Jonathan W. Autocracy under Siege: Security Police and Opposition in Russia, 1866–1905 (1998).

External links 
  P.Kropotkin: In Russian and French Prisons

Defunct prisons in Russia
History of Siberia
Labor in Russia
Penal labour
Settlement schemes in the Russian Empire
Former penal colonies